Amos Townsend (1821March 17, 1895) was an American politician who served three terms as a U.S. Representative from Ohio from 1877 to 1883.

Biography 
Born in Brownsville, Pennsylvania, Townsend attended the common schools of Pittsburgh, Pennsylvania, and clerked in a store in Pittsburgh.  He moved to Mansfield, Ohio, in 1839 and engaged in mercantile pursuits.  He served as United States marshal during the Kansas troubles.  He moved to Cleveland, Ohio, in 1858 and engaged in the wholesale grocery business.  He served as member of the Cleveland City Council 1866–1876, serving as president for seven years.  He served as member of the State constitutional convention in 1873.

Townsend was elected as a Republican to the Forty-fifth, Forty-sixth, and Forty-seventh Congresses (March 4, 1877 – March 3, 1883).  He served as chairman of the Committee on Railways and Canals (Forty-seventh Congress).  He declined renomination.  He served as member of a wholesale foodpacking firm.  He died while on a visit to St. Augustine, Florida, March 17, 1895. He was interred in Lake View Cemetery, Cleveland, Ohio.

Sources

1821 births
1895 deaths
United States Marshals
People from Brownsville, Pennsylvania
Burials at Lake View Cemetery, Cleveland
Cleveland City Council members
Ohio Constitutional Convention (1873)
19th-century American politicians
Republican Party members of the United States House of Representatives from Ohio